Huangpu Dadao station, literally Huangpu Avenue station, formerly Huangpu Avenue West station and Citizens' Square station, is a Guangzhou Metro APM line metro station in the Zhujiang New Town of Tianhe District. It is located at the underground of the West Huangpu Avenue, Zhujiang Road East, and Zhujiang Road West. It started operating on 8 November 2010.

Station layout

Exits

References

Railway stations in China opened in 2010
Guangzhou Metro stations in Tianhe District